Chauncy is the 1996 debut solo album by singer/songwriter/bassist Jason Scheff. Scheff is probably best known as a member of the band Chicago, where he has been the bassist and a lead singer since 1985. It also featured the only officially available recording of his 1993 co-composition "Mah Jongg" prior to the release of the original Chicago recording in 2008.

Track listing
 "Standing Here Beside Me"
 "If I Had a Wish"
 "You Found the One"
 "Mah Jongg" (Scheff, Brock Walsh, Aaron Zigman)
 "San Felipe"
 "Fade to Black"
 "Somewhere In Between Us"
 "Stolen Years"
 "Carry On"
 "Chauncy"

Personnel 
Adapted from AllMusic.

 Jason Scheff
 Moon Calhoun
 Richie Cannata
 Bill Champlin
 Luis Conte
 Gary Falcone
 Brandon Fields
 Scott Frankfurt
 John Keane
 Tom Keane
 Bobby Kimball
 Tim Pierce
 Paul Peterson
 Kenny Rankin
 Aaron Zigman
 Greg Greene

References

External links 
 Artist & album information at Blue Desert website

1996 albums